The Pakistan cricket team toured South Africa between December 2018 and February 2019 to play three Tests, five One Day Internationals (ODIs) and three Twenty20 International (T20I) matches. The ODI fixtures were part of both teams' preparation for the 2019 Cricket World Cup.

South Africa's Boxing Day Test was held at Centurion Park in Centurion for the first time. In the first session of the match, Dale Steyn became South Africa's leading wicket-taker in Tests, taking his 422nd wicket, surpassing Shaun Pollock who had held the record for ten years. South Africa's captain Faf du Plessis was penalised for a slow over-rate in the second Test and was suspended for the third and final Test of the series. Dean Elgar was named as the stand-in captain for the third Test. South Africa won the Test series 3–0.

During the second ODI, Pakistan's captain Sarfaraz Ahmed was caught on the stump mics making a racist comment towards Andile Phehlukwayo. Sarfraz played in the third ODI match, but was then suspended by the International Cricket Council (ICC) for the next four matches, missing the last two ODIs and the first two T20Is of the tour. Shoaib Malik was named as the captain for the fourth and fifth ODIs and the T20I series. The Pakistan Cricket Board (PCB) were disappointed with the ICC's decision to suspend Sarfraz, after Sarfraz apologised in person to Phehlukwayo before the start of the third ODI. South Africa went on to win the ODI series 3–2.

Faf du Plessis was rested for the last two T20Is of the series, with David Miller named as the captain of South Africa in his place. South Africa won the T20I series 2–1.

Squads

Dane Paterson was added to South Africa's squad for the first Test, replacing Vernon Philander, who had a finger injury. Pakistan's Haris Sohail suffered an injury before the start of the first Test and was later ruled out of the rest of the series. Pieter Malan was named as cover for Aiden Markram in South Africa's squad ahead of the third Test.

For the first two ODIs, South Africa rested Dale Steyn and Quinton de Kock, replacing them with Duanne Olivier and Aiden Markram. For the last three ODIs, Beuran Hendricks was added to South Africa's squad. Quinton de Kock and Dale Steyn were re-added to South Africa's squad for the last three matches after being rested, with Duanne Olivier, Dane Paterson and Heinrich Klaasen being dropped. Wiaan Mulder was added to South Africa's squad for the fifth ODI.

Mohammad Rizwan was added to Pakistan's squad for the T20I series, after Sarfaraz Ahmed was suspended. Asif Ali was also added to Pakistan's T20I squad. Quinton de Kock was ruled out of South Africa's T20I squad with a groin injury and was replaced by Janneman Malan. Mohammad Amir was added to Pakistan's squad for the final T20I of the series.

Tour match

Three-day match: Cricket South Africa Invitation XI vs Pakistan

Test series

1st Test

2nd Test

3rd Test

ODI series

1st ODI

2nd ODI

3rd ODI

4th ODI

5th ODI

T20I series

1st T20I

2nd T20I

3rd T20I

Notes

References

External links
 Series home at ESPN Cricinfo

2018 in South African cricket
2018 in Pakistani cricket
International cricket competitions in 2018–19
Pakistani cricket tours of South Africa